An author is a person who created (or is creating) a written work such as a book, poem, or article.

Author may also refer to:

 Author (bicycles), a Czech brand of bicycles and sporting goods
 Author citation (botany)
 Author citation (zoology)
 Author (music), the creator of a piece of music
 Authors (card game)
 Writer